Mike Holland may refer to:
Mike Holland (golfer) (born 1956), American golfer
Mike Holland (ski jumper) (born 1961), American former world record holder for longest jump
Mike Holland (politician), Canadian politician
Michael P. Holland, U.S. Navy rear admiral
Michael Holland (musician), American songwriter, musician, and producer
Michael Holland (politician), Australian politician

See also
Mike Hollands (born 1946), creative director and founder of Melbourne-based animation house Act3animation
Mick Holland (1918–2005), New Zealand speedway rider